The 1957 National Invitation Tournament was the 1957 edition of the annual NCAA college basketball competition.

Selected teams
Below is a list of the 12 teams selected for the tournament.

 Bradley
 Cincinnati
 Dayton
 Manhattan
 Memphis
 St. Bonaventure
 Saint Peter's
 Seattle
 Seton Hall
 Temple
 Utah
 Xavier

Bracket
Below is the tournament bracket.

See also
 1957 NCAA University Division basketball tournament
 1957 NCAA College Division basketball tournament
 1957 NAIA Basketball Tournament

References

National Invitation Tournament
National Invitation Tournament
1950s in Manhattan
Basketball in New York City
College sports in New York City
Madison Square Garden
National Invitation Tournament
National Invitation Tournament
Sports competitions in New York City
Sports in Manhattan